Ren Qilong (born January 1959) is a Chinese engineer currently serving as dean of College of Chemical and Biological Engineering, Zhejiang University.

Biography
He secondary studied at Dongyang No.2 High School. He earned a bachelor's degree in 1982, a master's degree in 1987, and a doctor's degree in 1998, all from Zhejiang University. His supervisor was Prof.Wu Ping. During his university years, he was the champion of long-distance running in the school sports meetings. After graduation, he taught at the university. He was a researcher at Osaka University from October 1992 to October 1993.

Honours and awards
 2018 State Technological Invention Award (Second Class) 
 November 22, 2019 Member of the Chinese Academy of Engineering (CAE)

References

External links
Ren Qilong on Zhejiang University 

1959 births
Living people
People from Dongyang
Engineers from Zhejiang
Zhejiang University alumni
Academic staff of Zhejiang University
Members of the Chinese Academy of Engineering